Herrera's mud turtle (Kinosternon herrerai) is a species of mud turtle in the family Kinosternidae. The species is endemic to Mexico.

Etymology
The specific name, herrerai, is in honor of Mexican biologist Alfonso Luis Herrera.

Life history 
Based on a 1988 study of a population near Rancho Nuevo in Tamaulipas, Mexico, the males of K. herrerai attain a larger size than females, with a proportionally smaller plastron, and narrower and shallower carapace. Symbionts reported include a balanomorph barnacle, leeches of the genus Phcobdelta, and the filamentous green alga Basichdia. The food items identified indicate an omnivorous diet, with wild figs the major plant component, and several insect orders and millipedes represented. Courtship in K. herrerai agrees in most respects with courtship of other kinosternid species. Sexual maturity in females is apparently attained between 115 and 130 mm carapace length. Clutch size is estimated to range from 2-4. Several clutches may be laid in a reproductive season.

Geographic range
K. herrerai is found in the Mexican states of Hidalgo, San Luis Potosí, Tamaulipas, and Veracruz.

References

Further reading
Stejneger, L. (1925). "New species and subspecies of American turtles". Journal of the Washington Academy of Science. 15: 462–463. (Kinosternon herrerai, new species, p. 462).

Kinosternon
Endemic reptiles of Mexico
Fauna of the Sierra Madre Oriental
Natural history of Hidalgo (state)
Natural history of San Luis Potosí
Natural history of Tamaulipas
Natural history of Veracruz
Endangered biota of Mexico
Reptiles described in 1925
Taxa named by Leonhard Stejneger